Lars Lundevall Is a Norwegian musician who is the guitarist in the band deLillos. He was part in the band as a touring guitarist in 1991, and an ordinary member from 1992. He has recorded a solo album under the name Mr. Smith. He was a member of the group Blister who recorded an album in 2003.

Discography 
Days of Fuzz (2004)

References

Norwegian guitarists
Norwegian male guitarists
Living people
Year of birth missing (living people)